José García (21 February 1926 – 8 January 2011) was a Uruguayan footballer. He played in 22 matches for the Uruguay national football team from 1945 to 1948. He was also part of Uruguay's squad for the 1945 South American Championship.

References

External links
 

1926 births
2011 deaths
Uruguayan footballers
Uruguay international footballers
Place of birth missing
Association football midfielders
Defensor Sporting players
Bologna F.C. 1909 players
Atalanta B.C. players
Uruguayan expatriate footballers
Expatriate footballers in Italy